Zina Garrison and Lori McNeil were the defending champions but they competed with different partners that year, Garrison with Pam Shriver and McNeil with Betsy Nagelsen.

McNeil and Nagelsen lost in the quarterfinals to Patty Fendick and Jill Hetherington.

Garrison and Shriver lost in the final 7–6, 7–6 against Jana Novotná and Helena Suková.

Seeds
Champion seeds are indicated in bold text while text in italics indicates the round in which those seeds were eliminated. The top four seeded teams received byes into the second round.

Draw

Final

Top half

Bottom half

References
 1988 Player's Canadian Open Doubles Draw

Doubles